Rockabill is a group of two islands, "The Rock" and "The Bill", lying in the western Irish Sea about 6 kilometres east-north-east of Skerries, County Dublin, Ireland. An alternative Irish name, Carraig Dhá Bheola, meaning Two Lips Rock, is probably just a corruption of Carraig Dábhiolla.

The two granite islands are separated by a channel about 20 metres wide. On the Rock there is a lighthouse, built 1855–1860 from granite and limestone and automated in 1989, and several walls and outbuildings. These walled areas have enabled a build-up of soil and the establishment of vegetation, notably tree mallow (Lavatera arborea), which provides nesting cover for the birds. The Bill is smaller and has very little vegetation.

Rockabill is an important seabird breeding island, especially notable for its terns. It is an internationally important site for roseate terns, with the largest colony in Europe, 1,597 pairs, and 2,085 pairs of Common Terns (2017 data). Other seabirds include black guillemots and black-legged kittiwakes.

Rockabill Lighthouse is owned by the Commissioners of Irish Lights and is a Refuge for Fauna and a Special Protection Area under the European Union Birds Directive. Since 1989, when the protection afforded by the lighthouse keepers ceased, the islands have been managed by BirdWatch Ireland. The sea area between Rockabill and Dalkey Island has recently been proposed as a Special Area of Conservation.

References 

Islands of County Dublin
Uninhabited islands of Ireland